Girish Wagh is currently the Head, Commercial Vehicle Business Unit. He earlier worked in the capacity of Sr. Vice President(Tata Small & Passenger Car Segment) & Head Project Planning and Program Management of Tata Motors. He is a key figure in the Tata Nano's project.

A mechanical engineer from the Maharashtra Institute of Technology, Wagh did a post-graduate programme in manufacturing from Mumbai B-school SP Jain Institute of Management and Research. At Tata Motors, he previously designed the Tata Ace mini truck. He is a native of Pune.

References

External links 
 Small Talk with Mr. Girish Wagh - Realizing the big "small car" dream 

Indian mechanical engineers
Living people
Year of birth missing (living people)
S. P. Jain Institute of Management and Research alumni
Businesspeople from Pune